Angelo Raffaele Jervolino (2 September 1890 – 10 March 1985) was an Italian Christian Democrat politician. 

He was the father of Rosa Russo Jervolino.

Biography
Angelo Raffaele Jervolino was born in Naples to a very poor family on 2 September 1890. Graduated in Law from the University of Naples Federico II and graduated from the same University for a Diplomatic and Consular career, he practiced law at the Supreme Court of Cassation, the Council of State, the Court of Auditors and the Sacra Romana Rota. He was also a professor of law for ten years at the Higher Institute of Letters and Sciences of Santa Chiara and a member of the Superior Forensic Council.

He entered the Neapolitan Catholic Action in 1908.

He served in the People's Party until its dissolution in 1926, however he preferred the activity of lay apostolate which he carried out through the Catholic Action of which he was diocesan president for Catholic Youth of Naples, then national councilor and general president for three two years from 1928 to 1934.

A convinced anti-fascist, he was a member of the National Liberation Committee representing the Christian Democracy, he participated as a protagonist in the birth of the democratic system and was political secretary of the DC for southern Italy until the capture of Rome, the day in which he and Migliori (secretary for northern Italy) resigned to hand the party over to Alcide De Gasperi.

He was called to be part of the Badoglio II government as undersecretary; he was part of the National Council; he was elected with very large suffrage to the Constituent Assembly in 1946 and joined that Assembly together with his wife Maria De Unterrichter, sister of Guido De Unterrichter.

Sub Commissioner of the Municipality in the period immediately following the Four days of Naples, in the following years, he was twice elected Municipal Councilor of Naples. He was elected Deputy in the first and second legislature in the college of Naples-Caserta. Among other things, he was the rapporteur for the law establishing the Fund for the South, as part of a continuous commitment to the southern areas.

He was elected Senator of the Republic in the third and fourth legislatures in the district of Nola.

He has participated in the government 13 times, five times as Undersecretary of State and eight times as Minister. In 1944 he was appointed Undersecretary of State at the Ministry of Education in the Badoglio Government. From 1944 to 1948 he was Undersecretary of State at the Ministry of Communications four times: in the first Bonomi Cabinet, in the second, third and fourth De Gasperi Cabinets. In 1948 he was appointed Minister of Post and Telecommunications in the V De Gasperi Government. In 1951 he was appointed Extraordinary Ambassador of Italy to Brazil. From 1960 to 1962 he was Minister of Merchant Navy in the second Segni and Tambroni government and in the third Fanfani government. From 1962 to 1963 he was Minister of Health in the fourth Fanfani government, reconfirmed in the first Leone government. From 1963 to 1966 he was Minister of Transport and Civil Aviation in the first and second Moro Governments.

On 12 December 1964, he was awarded the Gold Medal for Public Health by the President of the Republic. On 15 June 1968, he was appointed Knight of the Grand Cross Order of Merit of the Italian Republic.

He died on 10 March 1985 in Rome, aged 94.

Awards and decorations
 Knight Grand Cross of the Order of Merit of the Italian Republic (1968)

References

External links

1890 births
1985 deaths
Politicians from Naples
Christian Democracy (Italy) politicians
Italian Ministers of Health
Members of the National Council (Italy)
Members of the Constituent Assembly of Italy
Deputies of Legislature I of Italy
Deputies of Legislature II of Italy
Senators of Legislature III of Italy
Senators of Legislature IV of Italy